Christmas Bay is a small bay located on the Texas Gulf Coast in Brazoria County, Texas, immediately southwest of West Bay, near the Galveston Bay system's southwest corner. It is a minor estuary, one of a series of estuaries along the Gulf Coast of Texas, and receives the discharge from Bastrop Bayou, along with the adjacent coastal watershed. The bay is separated from the Gulf of Mexico by Follet's Island and connects with it through San Luis Pass and Cold Pass. Its minor extensions are Bastrop Bay to the north and Drum Bay to the southwest.

The area has not been significantly impacted by human activities. Much of its shoreline is protected within the Brazoria National Wildlife Refuge.

History 
Approximately 18 thousand years ago, the coast of the Gulf of Mexico took on its current shape during the last glacial period. Low global sea levels permitted the landmass of what is now Texas to stretch much farther south than it does now, and the Trinity River excavated a  canyon on its way to the ocean through what is now the Houston Ship Channel's outlet. Rising sea levels filled this tiny canyon first when the glacial era ended, followed by the vast lowlands of today's Trinity Bay. Between 7 and 5 thousand years ago, rapid sea-level rise moved the Gulf Coast northward to its current latitude.

Ecology 
This small bay is on the eastern coast of Texas near the city of Galveston. It is surrounded by the natural region of the Western Gulf coastal grasslands and marshes. The plains are crossed by meandering streams that run southeast into the western Galveston Bay estuary and feature vast fresh and salty marshes. The Texas Parks and Wildlife Department has classified the bay as a nursery habitat area and a Coastal Preserve because it supports a greater diversity of fin-fish than any other part of the Galveston Bay estuary system. The shallow-water perimeters of the preserve are home to the Texas quahog, an edible type of hard clam. Waterfowl and shorebirds, both migratory and permanent, can be found in the region. Waterbirds graze and nest on cordgrass stands, and huge oyster reefs may be found in the area. Two endangered bird species call it home, the piping plover and brown pelican. Red drum, speckled trout, black drum, and southern flounder are all common fish on the bayside. This unusual and complicated mixing of waters from many sources serves as a nursery and breeding ground for a diverse range of marine life, including crabs, shrimp, oysters, and a variety of fish, resulting in a thriving commercial fishing industry. The bay's channels provide ideal habitat for common bottlenose dolphins, which eat a variety of fish. In addition, the bayous, rivers, and marshes that surround the bay maintain their own ecosystems, supporting a varied range of fauna and allowing freshwater crawfish farming. The marshes that surround the bay are home to a diverse range of wildlife. The American alligator and the bobcat are notable terrestrial species, while the roseate spoonbill, great and snowy egrets, white-faced ibis, and mottled duck are notable avian species.

Climate 
The bay's climate is classed as humid subtropical. Prevailing south and southeast breezes bring heat from Mexico's deserts and precipitation from the Gulf of Mexico. Summer temperatures routinely surpass , and the humidity in the area raises the heat index even further. During the fall season, hurricanes are a constant concern.

References

External links
 
 Christmas Bay Foundation

Bays of Texas
Estuaries of Texas
Bodies of water of Brazoria County, Texas